The Zargari people are a Muslim Romani people ethnic group deriving from Zargar, Iran and neighboring villages. They speak the Zargari Romani a distinct dialect of the Balkan Romani, most closely related to those of Rumelia.  Historical documentation of their origins is lacking, but one seemingly-accurate tradition traces their origins to three Kuyumcu (Goldsmith) brothers, (zargar), who were migrated from Ottoman-held Rumelia, Maritsa Valley, today South Bulgaria to Ottoman Damascus from there invited to Shiraz as hostages during the reign of Nader Shah (1736-1747), and given pasture lands as a reward for their skills.  As Romani, they were also exempted from taxation and military service.

Although the Zargari once consisted of several clans, most of these have dispersed and lost their native language. The residents of Zargar predominantly belong to the Pāshālār clan. The Religion is Shia Islam.

References

Bibliography 
 Baghbidi, Hassan Rezai. "The Zargari language: An endangered European Romani in Iran", Romani Studies, vol. 13, pp. 123–148 (2003).Wayback Machine
 Marushiakova, Elena and Vesselin Popov. 2010. Migrations West to East in the Times of the Ottoman Empire: The Example of a Gypsy/Roma Group in Modern Iran. Anthropology of the Middle East 5 (1): 93–99. Migrations West to East in the Times of the Ottoman Empire: The Example of a Gypsy/Roma Group in Modern Iran
 McDowell, Bart. Gypsies: Wanderers of the World (Washington, DC: National Geographic Society, 1970), pp. 163-166.
 Windfuhr, Gernot. "European Gypsy in Iran: A First Report." Anthropological Linguistics 12.8 (1970): 271-292. European Gypsy in Iran: A First Report

Ethnic groups in Iran
Romani in Iran